Clodagh Simonds (born 16 May 1953) is an Irish musician, songwriter and singer. She was born in Banbridge, County Down, Northern Ireland and raised and educated in Killiney, County Dublin.

Biography 
At the age of eleven, she formed her first band, Mellow Candle, with two schoolfriends, Alison Bools (later Williams, later O'Donnell) and Maria White. They released their first single, "Feelin' High", on SNB Records in 1968, when she was 15.  Three years later, and with an expanded line-up, Mellow Candle released their only album, Swaddling Songs, which made little or no impact beyond Ireland until around twenty-five years later. The group disbanded in 1973. Between 1972 and 1975, she guested on Thin Lizzy's second album, Shades of a Blue Orphanage, and two Mike Oldfield albums: Hergest Ridge and Ommadawn, helping Oldfield to coin the title of the latter. She also appears on Oldfield's Amarok album, his 1990 spiritual sequel to Ommadawn. Between 1976 and 1986, she lived in New York where she worked in a band with Carter Burwell and Stephen Bray, as well as writing music for two theatre productions at La MaMa ETC, and occasionally working for Virgin Records.

Working within the recording industry had a negative impact on her career aims, and subsequently she resumed her long-abandoned studies of piano, and began studying music of other cultures.  In 1992, Simonds relocated from London to West Cork to focus on writing music. In 1996, her mini-album Six Elementary Songs was produced by Tom Newman and released on the Tokyo-based label Evangel Records. That same year, the album Virgin Prophet—consisting mostly of recordings for Deram by a pre-drums line-up of Mellow Candle—was released by UK label Kissing Spell. It also featured two even earlier solo demos, written and recorded by Simonds at the age of 16.

Twenty-five years or so after the release of the Mellow Candle album, interest in the band reawakened, starting in Japan, and the album has now been re-released several times, attaining cult status. One of Simonds' songs, "Silversong", was covered by All About Eve in 1988, and another, "Poet and the Witch", was covered by Stephen Malkmus in 1998.  In 1999, she sang a version of the Syd Barrett/James Joyce song "Golden Hair" for Russell Mills' album Pearl & Umbra. Between 2005 and 2007, under the name Fovea Hex, she released 3 EPs, collectively entitled Neither Speak Nor Remain Silent, featuring Michael Begg, Carter Burwell, John Contreras, Roger Doyle, Brian Eno, Roger Eno, Robert Fripp, Percy Jones, Cora Venus Lunny, Dónal Lunny, Andrew M. McKenzie of The Hafler Trio, Sarah McQuaid, Hugh O'Neill, Colin Potter of Nurse with Wound, Geoff Sample, Lydia Sasse, Laura Sheeran, and Steven Wilson. Each EP was available in a special edition that included an additional disc, containing an extensive re-working of that EP's material by The Hafler Trio.

As a performing unit, Fovea Hex usually consists of Clodagh Simonds, Laura Sheeran, Cora Venus Lunny, Michael Begg and Colin Potter, with either Julia Kent, Kate Ellis or John Contreras on cello. In May 2007, Fovea Hex performed at the invitation of David Lynch at the Fondation Cartier in Paris, as part of his The Air Is on Fire retrospective exhibition. Having also performed in Austria, Spain and Italy in 2007 and 2008, Fovea Hex made their debut Irish performance at the Electric Picnic festival in Stradbally, Co. Laois, in August 2008.

Clodagh Simonds presently lives in Dublin.

Discography

Albums
 Mellow Candle – Swaddling Songs (Deram, 1971)
 Fovea Hex – Bloom (part 1 of Neither Speak Nor Remain Silent, Janet Records/Die Stadt, 2005)
 Fovea Hex – Huge (part 2 of Neither Speak Nor Remain Silent, Janet Records/Die Stadt, 2006)
 Fovea Hex – Allure (part 3 of Neither Speak Nor Remain Silent, Janet Records/Die Stadt, 2007)
 Fovea Hex – Here Is Where We Used To Sing, Janet Records, 2012
 Fovea Hex - The Salt Garden 1, Headphone Dust/Die Stadt, 9 March 2016
 Fovea Hex - The Salt Garden 2, Headphone Dust/Die Stadt, June 2017

Singles
 Mellow Candle – "Feelin High"/"Tea with the Sun" (SNB, 1968)
 Mellow Candle –  "Dan The Wing"/"Silversong" (Deram, 1971)
 Fovea Hex & Andrew Liles – "Gone"/"Every Evening" (Die Stadt, 2007)

Selected credits
 Thin Lizzy – Shades of a Blue Orphanage (vocals, piano, mellotron)
 Mike Oldfield – Hergest Ridge (vocals)
 Mike Oldfield – Ommadawn (vocals, lyrics)
 Mike Oldfield – Amarok (vocals)
 Mike Oldfield – Tubular Bells III (vocals)
 Jade Warrior – Kites (vocals)
 Russell Mills – Pearl + Umbra (vocals, harmonium)
 Tunnels with Percy Jones – Natural Selection (treated vocals)
 Current 93 – Black Ships Ate The Sky (vocals, zither, psaltery)
 Matmos – For Alan Turing (vocals for Molly Malone)
 Human Greed – Black Hill: Midnight At the Blighted Star (piano)
 Steven Wilson – Insurgentes, (vocals, lyrics)
 Thinguma*jigsaw – Misery Together (piano on track: "Folkgore / Dulce Et Decorum Est Pro Pornografica Mori") (2012)

References

External links
Janet Records Website
Interview with The Irish Times, November 2008
Interview with Tokafi (January 2007) 
Interview with Black (German magazine, 2007)
Interview with BlowUp (Italian magazine, 2007)
Fovea Hex on Myspace
Review of "Bloom", Pitchfork Media
Review of "Huge", Pitchfork Media
Review of "Allure", Pitchfork media
Mellow Candle – comprehensive history extracted from IRISH FOLK, TRAD AND BLUES – A SECRET HISTORY
Electric Picnic

1953 births
Living people
Musicians from County Dublin
Women singers from Northern Ireland
Singer-songwriters from Northern Ireland
Women composers from Northern Ireland
Folk musicians from Northern Ireland
Experimental musicians
Psychedelic folk musicians
Mellow Candle members